The Police Remuneration Review Body (PRRB) is a United Kingdom Review Body that makes independent recommendations on pay and terms and conditions of employment of the police in England and Wales to the Government. It is funded by the Home Office, and the Office of Manpower Economics provides the Board with an independent Secretariat. It replaced  the Police Negotiating Board (PNB) on 1 October 2014, which remained active in Scotland.

Anita Bharucha was appointed as Chair of the body for a three-year term in December 2018 by Theresa May.

Recommendations and Government response
The below table summarises the PRRB's recommendation and the Government response. The response takes effect from 1 September in the same year of the review.

References

External links

Non-departmental public bodies of the United Kingdom government
Law enforcement in England and Wales